Communauté d'agglomération de Saintes is the communauté d'agglomération, an intercommunal structure, centred on the town of Saintes. It is located in the Charente-Maritime department, in the Nouvelle-Aquitaine region, southwestern France. Created in 2013, its seat is in Saintes. Its area is 474.6 km2. Its population was 60,110 in 2019, of which 25,287 in Saintes proper.

Composition
The communauté d'agglomération consists of the following 36 communes:

Burie
Bussac-sur-Charente
Chaniers
La Chapelle-des-Pots
Chérac
Chermignac
La Clisse
Colombiers
Corme-Royal
Courcoury
Dompierre-sur-Charente
Le Douhet
Écoyeux
Écurat
Fontcouverte
Les Gonds
La Jard
Luchat
Migron
Montils
Pessines
Pisany
Préguillac
Rouffiac
Saint-Bris-des-Bois
Saint-Césaire
Saintes
Saint-Georges-des-Coteaux
Saint-Sauvant
Saint-Sever-de-Saintonge
Saint-Vaize
Le Seure
Thénac
Varzay
Vénérand
Villars-les-Bois

References

Saintes
Saintes